Shelley Ross is an American television executive producer, former writer and editor at the National Enquirer, former executive producer of ABC News Good Morning America, and former executive producer at  CBS News The Early Show.

Career 
Ross was a segment producer of The Tomorrow Show in 1981. In 2016, she accused her boss, Roger Ailes, of sexual harassment shortly after she was hired in 1981. 

Ross was a producer for ABC News. For her work on prime time, in 2005, she won a shared Gerald Loeb Award for Television Deadline. Ross was a producer of The Early Show. 

In September 2021, she accused her previous employee, Chris Cuomo, of sexually harassing her in 2005 during an employee's farewell party at a bar in Manhattan. Stopping short of asking him to be fired from CNN, she said she would "like to see him journalistically repent." Cuomo admitted to the incident and apologized in a statement: "As Shelley acknowledges, our interaction was not sexual in nature. It happened 16 years ago in a public setting when she was a top executive at ABC. I apologized to her then, and I meant it."

References

External links 
 

 Shelley Ross - MotherhoodLater

Living people
Year of birth missing (living people)
Place of birth missing (living people)
American television news producers
Television producers from New York City
American women television producers
ABC News people
Gerald Loeb Award winners for Television